Stratford is a major multi-level railway station which rates as the 5th busiest station in Britain, serving the district of Stratford and the mixed-use development known as Stratford City, in the London Borough of Newham, east London. It is served by the London Underground, London Overground, Docklands Light Railway (DLR) and is also a National Rail station on the West Anglia Main Line and the Great Eastern Main Line,  from Liverpool Street. It is also the busiest station on the Tube network outside Travelcard Zone 1.

The station was opened in 1839 by the Eastern Counties Railway. Today it is owned by Network Rail and is in Travelcard zone 2/3. Stratford served as a key travel hub for the 2012 Olympic and Paralympic Games held in London. By the most recent National Rail entry and exit figures, it is the 5th busiest station in Britain (previously the busiest).

History

Early days: 1839–62
Stratford station was opened on 20 June 1839 by the Eastern Counties Railway (ECR) with the first station building being located on Angel Lane which crossed the line on an over-bridge to the east of the station. As well as a station, a railway works was built adjacent to the line to Broxbourne. This and the engine shed later expanded into the area to the west of the station which is now occupied by a shopping centre and Stratford International station.

At this time there was no legislation dictating the choice of gauge and indeed the directors favoured the Great Western Railway's broad gauge . Braithwaite persuaded the directors otherwise on the grounds of additional cost but recommended the  gauge in an effort to reduce wear on locomotive parts. This choice meant that the Northern & Eastern Railway who were planning to share the ECR line between Stratford and Bishopsgate were forced to adopt the same gauge.

With the extension of the ECR in the early 1840s it became apparent that standard gauge  was a more realistic choice and subsequently between September and October 1844 the gauge conversion was carried out. At the same time the associated Northern & Eastern Railway was also converted.

New station buildings were built in 1847 replacing the original structure on Angel Road. These were located in the V between the Cambridge and Colchester lines and access was via Station Road.

The line through the low level platforms first opened in 1846 as a goods only branch as far as Thames Wharf. The bridge under the main line was too low for many locomotives, so a number of engines were equipped with hinged chimneys in order they could operate the line. On opening there was also a line that linked what is now known as the Great Eastern Main Line directly to the docks enabling through running from Colchester to Thames Wharf. The docks and associated railway networks expanded with passenger services to North Woolwich starting in 1847.

There was an accident at Stratford station on 18 July 1846 when an up goods train ran into the back of a passenger train from Ipswich. There were 10 passengers seriously injured one of whom later died.

In 1854 the newly opened London Tilbury and Southend Railway served Stratford joining the main line at Forest Gate Junction a few miles north. Their services generally served Fenchurch Street and were routed via the Bow Road route (although that station was not opened at this time) although some carriages were detached at Stratford for onward working to Bishopsgate. This practice was discontinued in 1856 as passengers preferred the more conveniently sited (for the city) Fenchurch Street.

In connection with the introduction of the new LTSR services a third line was built from Stratford to Bow Junction which was used by down Fenchurch Street services and a new platform face opened.

It soon became apparent that congestion was a problem at Stratford and by 1856 permission was sought to build a line from Barking to Gas Factory Junction (Bow) which was opened in 1858. After that LTSR trains were no longer routed via Stratford.

By 1855 there were links from both the low and high-level stations to the North London Line as well as a spur that enabled trains from Liverpool Street to North Woolwich to avoid Stratford altogether (although this served Stratford Market station) which was a short distance away. Services from the North London line normally started from Victoria Park and ran through to Stratford Market. This service operated from 1866 until 1874 and was operated by the GER and North London Railway in alternate years up until 31 October 1874.

The North London Railway was also running through Stratford high level with two return trains per day from Hampstead Road (later renamed Chalk Farm) via Victoria Park and Forest Gate Junctions to Tilbury which commenced on 1 July 1855 and finished 30 September.

Services to Loughton commenced on 22 August 1856 and used the Lea Valley platforms, leaving the main line at Loughton Branch Junction half a mile north of Stratford. Initially nine trains per day operated to Fenchurch Street (Bishopsgate on Sundays) on this route.

By the 1860s the railways in East Anglia were in financial trouble, and most were leased to the ECR; they wished to amalgamate formally, but could not obtain government agreement for this until 1862, when the Great Eastern Railway was formed by amalgamation. Thus Stratford became a GER station in 1862.

Great Eastern Railway: 1862–1923
The Loughton branch was extended to Ongar on 24 April 1865 and by 1874 there were a total of 40 trains each day (10 terminating at Loughton, 18 at Epping and 12 at Ongar) with most serving the newly opened Liverpool Street although a few peak hour services continued to serve Fenchurch Street.

Even after LTSR services were routed away from Stratford in 1858 working was intense. Following an accident in 1866 the accident report noted that "Stratford needs complete re-arranging, extending and fitting with modern improvements for working points and signals, as in its present state it appears to be quite insufficient for the traffic that passes through it". Although one of the signal boxes had interlocking fitted soon after, the poor state of GER finances saw little further work until 1877 when a significant rebuilding of Stratford took place.

Another short-lived North London Railway service operated in September and October 1866, linking Chalk Farm with Barking (again routed via Victoria Park and Forest Gate Junctions). This service was withdrawn due to congestion, and one of the services was involved in a collision on 10 September 1866 with 20 passengers being injured.

The 1877 rebuilding saw a number of changes made, which were:
 A fourth line was added from Bow Junction to Stratford;
 Western Junction (where a spur to towards the Woolwich line existed along with various crossovers) was moved further west;
 New Goods lines added on the down (north) side of the line between Western Junction and the Cambridge line platforms – changes made at Central Junction to accommodate these;
 New Goods lines between Western Junction and Maryland Point signal box (west of the current 2015  station);
 Eastern curve (which allowed up goods trains from the main line to directly access the low level line towards the docks) was re-aligned; and
 New signal boxes at Eastern, Central and Western Junctions.

During 1886 and 1887 improvements were made to the station buildings and the canopies extended.

On 26 December 1886 a train was derailed at Stratford station as facing points had not been properly locked into position. Fortunately there was no loss of life.

By 1889 traffic on the GER had grown to such an extent, that quadrupling the section from Bethnal Green to Bow Junction and from Maryland Point-Romford was proposed. Once again significant changes which were implemented between 1891 and 1893 and included:
 Two additional lines from Bow Junction resulting in six tracks in total (named Up and Down Local, Up and Down Through and Up and Down Fenchurch Street);
 To accommodate these the Up and Down Fenchurch Street lines were slewed to the south of the formation;
 The 1877 signal boxes at Western, Central and Eastern Junctions were all replaced between 1891 and 1893; and
 Carpenters Road curve added at this time (Western Junction to Carpenters Road Junction)

In 1896 the low-level line was lowered under the main line so locomotives no longer required hinged chimneys.

By July 1897 it was apparent that the decision not to include platforms on both Through lines was causing some operational difficulty. To address this a new platform serving the Up Through line was opened in 1900.

The Fairlop Loop opened on 1 May 1903 and services generally ran as an out and back circle from either Liverpool Street or Fenchurch Street. The routing of these services was Liverpool Street – Stratford – Ilford – Fairlop Loop – Woodford – Stratford – Liverpool Street) and Liverpool Street – Stratford – Woodford – Fairlop Loop – Ilford – Stratford – Liverpool Street in the reverse direction.

On 1 January 1923 the GER became part of the London & North Eastern Railway.

London and North Eastern Railway: 1923–47
By the 1930s electric tramways were taking a lot of traffic from the railway and proposals were drawn up to electrify the lines from Liverpool Street to Shenfield using the 1500 V DC system. By 1938 the major contracts were let and work started. Despite the commencement of World War 2 in 1939 work continued on the scheme but the scheme was postponed in late 1940. In February 1946 the LNER announced work would recommence. On 5 October 1946 the new interchange platforms with the Central Line (see below) were opened.

Central Line services started on 4 December 1946, extended from Liverpool Street station in new tunnels after being delayed due to the Second World War. Prior to this date trains to and from Epping and Ongar had used the currently numbered platforms 11 and 12 and diverged from the Broxbourne line about half a mile north of the station. Trains for the Hainault loop used either these platforms or the currently numbered platform 5 (up) or 8 (down) diverging from the Great Eastern Main Line at a junction between Ilford and Seven Kings which has since been redeveloped as part of the Ilford Carriage sheds.

British Railways: 1948–96

The nationalisation of Britain's railways saw the operation of Stratford station pass to British Railways Eastern Region. A new station building was designed by Thomas Bennett and opened in 1948.

Progress on electrification that had been halted by the Second World War resumed after the end of hostilities. The line between Liverpool Street and Stratford was electrified from 3 December 1946, and the full electrification of the Shenfield line at 1500 V DC was completed in September 1949.
The electric service between Liverpool Street to Shenfield was inaugurated on 26 September 1949 but services were run to steam timings with a number of steam trains still operating. The full electric service officially commenced on 7 November 1949 (although a full dummy run had taken place the previous day). Two days earlier services to Fenchurch Street via Bow Road were withdrawn.

On 8 April 1953 a collision occurred in the Central Line tunnels just to the east of Stratford station.

In 1960-61 the 1,500 V DC electrification to Shenfield line which had been extended to Southend and Chelmsford was converted to 6.25kV ac.

In the autumn of 1980 conversion of the overhead electrification from 6.25kV ac to the standard supply of 25kV ac of the Liverpool St. to Shenfield line.

The Docklands Light Railway opened on 31 August 1987 reusing redundant rail routes through the Bow and Poplar areas to reach the new Docklands developments on the Isle of Dogs. Initially the line used one of the south facing bays which had been built for the Fenchurch street via Bow Road service (but never used).

Privatisation era: 1996–present
The low-level station was substantially rebuilt in the late 1990s as part of the Jubilee Line Extension works, with a large new steel and glass building designed by Wilkinson Eyre that encloses much of the low-level station, and a new ticket hall. The old ticket hall, at the eastern end of the station and connected via a subway, has since been demolished.

In April 2009 the North London Line platforms at Stratford moved to newly built high-level platforms 1 & 2 from the original low-level platforms 1 & 2, freeing the old platforms for the DLR's Stratford International service which opened in August 2011. After rebuilding the old platforms reopened as platforms 16 and 17.

With the great increase in services and passengers since the Second World War, Stratford has changed from a fairly busy junction into one of Britain's major rail interchanges.

With Crossrail a link will open between Stratford and Whitechapel in autumn 2022 to allow Elizabeth line trains to Heathrow and Reading via Paddington. The link opened in November 2022. All trains, save for some early morning, late night and peak hour services, go via Whitechapel.

Station layout

High-level platforms

The high-level platforms run at right angles to the low-level, roughly east–west. The Docklands Light Railway serving platforms 16 and 17 passes beneath the high-level station. Except for platforms 4A and 4B, access from the main station entrance is via subways, one of which links the Jubilee line platforms directly to platforms 3 and 5 to 10. Another subway, which had served the old entrance to the station, was re-opened in September 2010.
 Platforms 1 and 2 are used by the London Overground's North London Line. They comprise an island platform with a step-free link to platform 12 and the subways linking to platforms 3 to 11. The platforms can accommodate trains with up to six carriages, though at present, due to short platforms elsewhere, shorter trains are used.
 Platforms 3, 3A and 6 are used by the London Underground Central line, which rise from their tunnels onto the overground here and then immediately descend back underground upon departure from Stratford. Platforms 3 and 6 are island platforms providing cross-platform interchange with the Elizabeth line and weekend c2c services operating from platforms 5 and 8 respectively, while platform 3A has a direct step-free connection at mezzanine level, facilitating easier interchange with Jubilee line trains on platforms 13 to 15 and DLR trains on platforms 4A and 4B. Westbound Central line trains travelling towards central London open doors on both sides so that passengers can alight and board trains from either platform, reducing dwell times and peak-hour congestion in the passageways.
 Platforms 4 and 7 are disused. However, this service was never introduced (despite all the works required being carried out). From the 1980s platform 4 was used as the terminus of the DLR while platform 7 remained abandoned. In 2007 platform 4 was abandoned again as the DLR moved to two new platforms to the south of platform 4, though these are signposted as "platform 4" within the station.
They are formed of an island platform, and are not accessed by the subways but through a separate entrance on the upper level of the main concourse.
 Platforms 5 and 8 are used by Elizabeth line stopping services on the electric line between Liverpool Street and Shenfield. Weekend c2c trains call on the way to or from Liverpool Street connecting to or from the London, Tilbury and Southend line via . Cross-platform interchange is available with the Central line running from platforms 3 and 6 respectively.
 Platforms 9, 10 and 10A are used by Greater Anglia services on the main line out of Liverpool Street towards  and intermediate stations and branch lines. Originally there were only two platforms here, but in the 1990s the station buildings on platform 9 were demolished to make an island platform with faces on both sides. The new face became number 9, the former 9 became 10, and the previous platform 10 became 10A.
 Platforms 11 and 12 are used for the Greater Anglia services to  that start from Stratford. In 2021 these platforms were additionally used for London Overground's North London Line.

Low-level platforms
These platforms are at ground level and run north–south. Platforms 13 to 16 are served by a footbridge (with lifts and escalators) from the main station entrance, while platform 17 adjoins directly onto the main station concourse.
 Platforms 13 to 15 were built in the late 1990s to serve the Jubilee line when it was extended to Stratford in 1999. All three are bay platforms. A footbridge joins the platforms at the southern end, away from the main station building. Since 2018, almost all trains use platforms 14 and 15 (an island platform), with platform 13 only seeing a few trains at either end of the day (including Night Tube services).
Following the closure of the line to North Woolwich in 2006, these effectively became terminus platforms, with trains departing westbound only towards Richmond. The new platforms have also been built with a reversing siding immediately to the south, accessible from both running lines. This enables trains from Stratford International to terminate at Stratford and trains from Canning Town to also terminate here. There is also a crossover immediately to the north, allowing trains from the southbound platform to reverse onto the northbound line back to Stratford International.

Services

Stratford is a major rail hub with services operated by Greater Anglia, London Overground, the Elizabeth line and London Underground on the Central and Jubilee Lines. The typical off-peak service in trains per hour (tph) is:

Electrification
All lines at Stratford are electrified, although a few passenger and freight services which pass through this station are hauled by diesel locomotives. At one time there were four different systems of electrification in use, a record for any station in London. However, since the diversion of the North London Line from the low-level to the new high-level platforms these trains have changed the electrical system they use while at this station. The remaining systems used are:
 25 kV 50 Hz   overhead on Network Rail lines (high level)
 630 V DC fourth rail on London Underground Central and Jubilee lines
 750 V DC bottom-contact conductor rail on Docklands Light Railway
 Since April 2009, 750 V DC third rail is no longer used at this station. This was used for the London Overground (low level) North London Line services.

In 1949 the Great Eastern Main Line through Stratford was electrified at 1,500VDC overhead before being converted to 6.25kV AC 50Hz overhead in 1960 and converted again to 25kV in about 1976.

Geography

Channelsea River
The Channelsea River is a culverted major tidal stream that is one of the Bow Back Rivers that flow into the Bow Creek part of the River Lea.  It flows under Stratford station and rises along the Jubilee line platforms to the south. It was diverted in the 19th century by the Great Eastern Railway and again during construction of the Jubilee Line platforms in the 1990s.

Nearby facilities

Goods facilities
There were three primary goods facilities in the Stratford area in the steam age, although the nearby Stratford Works and engine shed generated their own traffic. A short distance to the north of Stratford station (on the line to Cambridge) there were marshalling yards at Temple Mills. There was a small goods yard north of the station on the east side of the line which occupied a constrained site. The mainstay of traffic was domestic coal although shortly before closure in the 1960s the site was used as a reception point for concrete components for the building of tower blocks in Newham.

There was a small depot at Carpenters Road about a quarter of a mile south of Stratford station. Opened in 1900, the depot consisted of four long sidings and primarily dealt with coal and building materials. It was closed on 7 December 1964.

There was a large depot at Stratford Market railway station. All of these three facilities were operated by the Great Eastern Railway up until 1923 before being taken over by the London & North Eastern Railway until nationalisation in 1948 when they became part of British Railways Eastern Region.

There was also a goods terminal at Bow operated by the Midland Railway which is still open today mostly for building materials. This yard operated as the terminal for building materials for the adjacent Olympics site.

Between Stratford and Maryland stations Windmill Lane cattle pens existed on the down side of the line whilst four private sidings belonging to Young & Martens were located on the up side.

During the 1960s part of the Stratford Works site was converted to the London International Freight Terminal (LIFT) which opened in 1967 and there was a freight liner terminal that operated on the far side of the Stratford railway complex (on the Channelsea Loop line) between 1967 and 1994. The former site is now occupied by the international station and shopping centre.

Stratford International

The nearby Stratford International station opened on 30 November 2009 (for preview services only). Since 13 December 2009 Southeastern began its full domestic high-speed service between London St Pancras, directly to Ebbsfleet International and Ashford in Kent. The Docklands Light Railway 'Stratford International' extension has provided a link between the two stations since 31 August 2011. There is also a walking route between the two stations passing through Westfield Stratford City Shopping Centre.

Despite Stratford International's name, no international trains call there, and Eurostar (currently the only international operator) has no plans to do so. Passengers instead interconnect on high-speed trains travelling to either London St Pancras or Ebbsfleet in Kent, there are a number of other potential operators that may use the station for international services. These include Deutsche Bahn's proposed London-Frankfurt/Amsterdam service.

Stratford City

In preparation for the Olympics and the Stratford City development, a new north-facing exit and ticket hall has been built. Both existing passenger subways have been extended north to connect with the ticket hall, and the abandoned subway at the eastern end of the station, which formed part of the old station complex, has been reopened and refurbished to allow interchange between platforms 3–12 and the new high-level platforms 1 & 2. A new pedestrian bridge has also been built to connect Stratford shopping centre with the Stratford City development. This also connects the mezzanine-level ticket hall with the northern one. The northern ticket hall and the footbridge opened along with Westfield Stratford City on 13 September 2011.

Bus stations

Stratford bus station is to the south of the station and Stratford City bus station is to the north. Both are served by bus services right across London and to the Queen Elizabeth Olympic Park.

Future proposals
Stansted Express may call at Stratford in the future via the West Anglia Main Line, reconnecting the two to each other.

The Hall Farm Curve link could be reinstated allowing a Liverpool Street to Chingford service via Stratford. Designs for new services have been suggested to reduce journey times between Chingford and Stratford to 20 minutes, and high-frequency journeys between Walthamstow Central and Stratford to 12 minutes from the current duration of about 35 minutes.

References

External links

 Excel file displaying National Rail station usage information for 2005/06 

 Docklands Light Railway website – Stratford station page
 Diagram showing planned platform layout of Stratford Station
 Diagram showing planned subway layout of Stratford Station
 More photographs of Stratford station
 DLR Project Updates at Stratford Station

Stratford, London
1839 establishments in England
DfT Category B stations
Jubilee line stations
Docklands Light Railway stations in the London Borough of Newham
Central line (London Underground) stations
London Underground Night Tube stations
Tube stations in the London Borough of Newham
Railway stations served by London Overground
Railway stations in the London Borough of Newham
Former Great Eastern Railway stations
Railway stations in Great Britain opened in 1839
Railway stations served by c2c
Transit centers in the United Kingdom
Greater Anglia franchise railway stations
Railway stations served by the Elizabeth line
Queen Elizabeth Olympic Park
Thomas Penberthy Bennett railway stations